Manuel Domingo Melquiades Almenara Butler (August 4, 1848 – June 20, 1931) was a Peruvian lawyer, judge and politician. He was a member of the Civilista Party. He was Prime Minister of Peru (October 1900 – September 1901). He simultaneously served as minister of the interior in the Government of Peru. He was Minister of Finance from 1900 to 1901. He was President of the Supreme Court of Peru (1914–1916). He died in Lima, Peru.

Bibliography
 Basadre, Jorge: Historia de la República del Perú. 1822 - 1933, Octava Edición, corregida y aumentada. Tomos 8 y 9. Editada por el Diario "La República" de Lima y la Universidad "Ricardo Palma". Impreso en Santiago de Chile, 1998.
Tauro del Pino, Alberto: Enciclopedia Ilustrada del Perú. Tercera Edición. Tomo 1. AAA/ANG. Lima, PEISA, 2001.

References

1848 births
1931 deaths
19th-century Peruvian lawyers
20th-century Peruvian judges
Civilista Party politicians
Peruvian Ministers of Economy and Finance
Presidents of the Supreme Court of Peru